On Purpose may refer to:
On Purpose (album), by Clint Black
"On Purpose" (song), by Sabrina Carpenter